Karala is a village in North West District in Union Territory of Delhi, India. It is surrounded by Rohini Sector 38, Rohini Sector 37, Kanjhawala, Sultanpur Dabas and Madanpur Dabas. Its PIN code is 110081. The Nearest Metro Station are Mundka Metro Station & Rithala Metro Station. Which are Approx. 6 km & 10 km from Karala.

Demographics
Karala is the largest advanced urban village in Delhi. Permanent residents of this village include all castes like Jaat (Majority) Brahmins, Baniya, but in recent years people from different regions resided here who came in search of better livelihood from different regions of India. The village Karala itself has Jat people (MATHUR Gotr) in majority, but nearby colonies have people from different states. Karala has population of 35,730 of which 19,085 are males while 16,645 are females as per report released by Census India 2011. The female Sex Ratio is 872 against the state average of 868. The literacy rate of Karala is 86.38%, higher than the state average of 86.21%. In Karala, male literacy is around 92.58% while female literacy rate is 79.32%.

Transportation
Karala village is almost 5 km far from Mundka Railway Station and Metro Station, the distance between Rithala Metro Station and Karala is 10  km or 6.2 miles or 5.4 nautical miles and almost 7  km far from Ghewra Village Railways Station. One can easily reach to Karala Village by getting DTC bus nos. 114, 114C & 114B 174, 921, 247, 182, 972A, 741, 962A, 962. There's no direct metro service for Karala but bus services are pretty good and one can easily get there by boarding out at Pitam Pura, Rithala, and Mundka Metro Stations and from there by taking mini private buses or DTC and Orange Cluster buses.

Geography 

Nearby villages are Kanjhawala, Mohammadpur Majri, Rani Khera, Sultanpur Dabas and Begumpur. Karala has many small settlements namely Shiv Vihar, Anandpur Dham, Rama Vihar etc. Most of the people who know about Karala do not know about its span.

Local 

The village deity is Dada Mandu. There is a big temple associated with the deity, and is worshiped by not only people of Karala but also by the people from nearby villages and colonies. A big annual feast is organised in his name which is embraced by people across the district.

There is also a big pond adjacent to the temple. Nearing this temple is another beautiful and huge temple of Radha-Krishna, which is also a place of attraction and worship for the locals. There are places of worship for different religions as well, there is a Church, there are Mosques, Gurudwaras, and many more. The village also has a big stadium with a football playground. Karala has its own football club that is KFC (Karala Football Club). The song 'Jo Bhi Main' from the Bollywood movie "Rockstar" has been shot in this stadium on 14 December 2010. There is also a park named as Shaheed Bhagat Singh Park, which is situated in the middle of the village called Bazar Panna, where all the trade union meetings held. On the educational institution front, Karala has a Primary Government School, Girls' Senior Secondary Government School, that arranges afternoon shift for boys as well, and many Private Schools. Karala has its own post office but the S.O. office is in Kanjhawala. Karala has its own water tank attached to the Delhi Jal Board old office. Karala has its own Sanskrit Paathshala, situated in Rama Vihar near the very famous Balaji Temple, one of the oldest Sanskrit schools since the English time. There are hospitals, hotels, eat-outs, banks, ATMs and many more services that are of importance in daily life, are easily accessible here.The situation of main road is very critical in this village. This village is surrounded by the cluster of low level colonies. The drainage system of this village is also very poor and streets are full of dirty water and mud.

Administration 

The SDM office and the police station is in Kanjhawala. All the judicial activities come under SDM Kanjhawala, New Delhi. All the law and order situations fall under the area of Kanjhawala police station. The MCD councilor seat no. 35 comes under Karala administration. Karala village is in Mundka Assembly Constituency (08).

Villages in North West Delhi district